Tattoo Fixers is a British reality television series based in Hackney in London, broadcast on E4, from 23 June 2015 to 29 January 2020. The series follows some talented tattoo artists helping members of the public cover up some of the rudest and crudest tattoos by transforming them from extreme inking disasters into walking works of art.

Cast

Episodes

Production 
On 12 February 2015, Digital Spy announced that television channel, E4, would be commissioning a nine-part documentary series; The Tattoo Fixers. However, it was later shortened to Tattoo Fixers. The series follows the same format as the American show Tattoo Nightmares.

The original cast of Tattoo Fixers included Jay Hutton, Sketch Porter, Lou Hopper and Paisley Billings.

For the second series, Hopper was replaced by Alice Perrin. All other cast members from series one returned.

In 2016 it was revealed that all cast members from the second series would return for the third series. These include Jay Hutton, Sketch Porter, Alice Perrin and Paisley Billings.

On 12 July 2017, the show announced that a new tattoo fixer would be joining the cast for the fourth series, Glen Carloss. All other cast members from series 3 returned. This also marked the first series to have four tattooists present.

In 2018 it was confirmed that Hutton would not be returning for the fifth series. It was later confirmed that the fourth series tattooist Glen Carloss would not return for another series. It was later revealed that Hutton and Carloss' replacements would be Pash and Uzzi Canby, two brothers from Devon.

Tattoo Fixers was not renewed for a sixth season and although not confirmed no further series have aired since February 2019.

International broadcasts
In Australia, the series premiered on GO! on 2 September 2015.

Spin-offs 
In 2016, Channel 4 announced the commission of two Tattoo Fixers spin-offs. Tattoo Fixers on Holiday will be similar to the parent series but with a focus on tattoos picked up on holidays abroad, whilst Body Fixers will look at non-tattoo cosmetic alterations such as body piercing, hair dye and botox. Casting calls for Body Fixers began to appear after episodes of Tattoo Fixers from February 2016 and the series began on 13 September 2016.

Airing from April 2017, Tattoo Artist of the Year will be judged by Jay Hutton and Rose Hardy.

Reception

Critical reception
Professional tattoo artists have been heavily critical of Tattoo Fixers, accusing the show of misrepresenting the industry.

Awards and nominations

References

External links

Tattoo Fixers official website
Tattoo Fixers Facebook page

2015 British television series debuts
2019 British television series endings
2010s British reality television series
Channel 4 reality television shows
E4 reality television shows
English-language television shows
Tattooing television series
Television series by All3Media
Television shows set in London